Abbeville Publishing Group is an independent book publishing company specializing in fine art and illustrated books. Based in New York City, Abbeville publishes approximately 40 titles each year and has a catalogue of over 700 titles on art, architecture, design, travel, photography, parenting, and children's books.

The company was founded in 1977 by Robert E. Abrams and his father Harry N. Abrams, who had previously founded the art book publishing company Harry N. Abrams, Inc. in 1949.

Honors and awards bestowed upon Abbeville titles include the George Wittenborn Award for Art across America (1991).

Imprints and divisions
Abbeville Publishing Group's major imprint is Abbeville Press, which consists of art and illustrated books for an international readership.

Abbeville Gifts is an imprint which produces desk diaries, stationery, and other printed merchandise.

In 2007 the company announced the launch of Abbeville Family, a new division publishing titles for parents, children, and families. Abbeville Family encompasses the Abbeville Kids imprint, which makes children's illustrated books. The New Father series by Armin Brott is also part of Abbeville Family, as are the New Father audiobooks, published under the Abbeville Audio imprint.

References

External links

Book publishing companies based in New York (state)
Visual arts publishing companies
Publishing companies established in 1977
American companies established in 1977